A pitaya or pitahaya is the fruit of several different cactus species indigenous to the region of southern Mexico and along the Pacific coasts of Guatemala, Costa Rica, and El Salvador. Pitaya is cultivated in East Asia, South Asia, Southeast Asia, the United States, the Caribbean, Australia, and throughout tropical and subtropical regions of the world.

Pitaya usually refers to fruit of the genus Stenocereus, while pitahaya or dragon fruit refers to fruit of the genus Selenicereus (formerly Hylocereus), both in the family Cactaceae. The common name in English  dragon fruit  derives from the leather-like skin and scaly spikes on the fruit exterior. Depending on the variety, pitaya fruits may have sweet- or sour-tasting flesh that can be red, white, or yellow in color. 

Dragon fruit is cultivated in Peru, Mexico, South Asia, Southeast Asia, East Asia, the United States, the Caribbean, Australia, Mesoamerica and throughout tropical and subtropical regions of the world.

Vernacular names 
These fruits are commonly known in English as "dragon fruit", a name used since 1963, apparently resulting from the leather-like skin and prominent scaly spikes on the fruit exterior. The fruit may also be known as a strawberry pear.

The names pitahaya and pitaya derive from Mexico, and pitaya roja in Central America and northern South America, possibly relating to pitahaya for names of tall cacti species with flowering fruit.

Geography 

Pitaya or dragon fruit is native to the region of southern Mexico and along the Pacific coasts of Guatemala, Costa Rica, and El Salvador. The dragon fruit is cultivated in East Asia, South Asia, Southeast Asia, the United States, the Caribbean, Australia, and throughout tropical and subtropical regions of the world.

Varieties

Stenocereus 
Stenocereus fruit (sour pitayas) are a variety that is commonly eaten in the arid regions of the Americas. They are more sour and refreshing, with juicier flesh and a stronger taste.

The sour pitaya or pitaya agria (S. gummosus) in the Sonoran Desert has been an important food source for indigenous peoples of the Americas. The Seri people of northwestern Mexico still harvest the fruit, and call the plant ziix is ccapxl "thing whose fruit is sour".

The fruit of related species, such as S. queretaroensis and the dagger cactus or pitaya de mayo (S. griseus), are also locally important foods. The fruit of the organ pipe cactus (S. thurberi, called ool by the Seris) is the pitaya dulce "sweet pitaya". It has a more tart taste than Selenicereus fruit, described as somewhat reminiscent of watermelon.

Dragon fruit, Selenicereus 

Sweet pitayas come in three types, all with leathery, slightly leafy skin:
 Selenicereus undatus (Pitaya blanca or white-fleshed pitaya, also known as Hylocereus undatus) has pink-skinned fruit with white flesh. This is the most commonly seen "dragon fruit".
 Selenicereus costaricensis (Pitaya roja or red-fleshed pitaya, also known as Hylocereus costaricensis, and possibly incorrectly as Hylocereus polyrhizus) has red-skinned fruit with red flesh.  
 Selenicereus megalanthus (Pitaya amarilla or yellow pitaya, also known as Hylocereus megalanthus) has yellow-skinned fruit with white flesh.

Early imports from Colombia to Australia were designated "Hylocereus ocampensis" (or "Cereus repandus", the red fruit) and "Cereus triangularis" (supposedly, the yellow fruit).

Cultivation 

After a thorough cleaning of the seeds from the pulp of the fruit, the seeds may be stored when dried. The ideal fruit is unblemished and overripe.

Seeds grow well in a compost or potting soil mix – even as a potted indoor plant. Pitaya cacti usually germinate after between 11 and 14 days after shallow planting. As they are cacti, overwatering is a concern for home growers. As their growth continues, these climbing plants will find something to climb on, which can involve putting aerial roots down from the branches in addition to the basal roots. Once the plant reaches a mature  in weight, the plant may flower.

Plants can take up to 60 months/260 weeks to come into full commercial production, at which stage yields of  can be expected.

Pitaya flowers bloom overnight and usually wilt by the evening.  They rely on nocturnal pollinators such as bats or moths for fertilization. Self-fertilization will not produce fruit in some species and while cross-breeding has resulted in several "self-fertile" varieties, cross-pollinating with a second, genetically distinct plant of the same species generally increases fruit set and quality. This limits the capability of home growers to produce the fruit. However, the plants can flower between three and six times per year depending on growing conditions. Like other cacti, if a healthy piece of the stem is broken off, it may take root in the soil and become its own plant.

The cacti thrive most in USDA zones 10–11, but may survive outdoors in zone 9a or 9b.

Selenicereus has adapted to live in dry tropical climates with a moderate amount of rain. In numerous regions, it has escaped cultivation to become a weed and is classified as an invasive weed in some countries.

Pests and diseases 
Stems and fruits are susceptible to several diseases caused by fungi, bacteria, a nematode, and a virus. Overwatering or excessive rainfall can cause the flowers to drop and fruit to rot. The bacterium Xanthomonas campestris causes the stems to rot. Dothiorella fungi can cause brown spots on the fruit. Other fungi known to infect pitaya include Botryosphaeria dothidea, Colletotrichum gloeosporioides and Bipolaris cactivora. Pitayas are common in international trade and so pests are constantly moved with the fruits. Pitayas are less hospitable to larval development, retarding full size and full visibility to the scanner.

As food 
The fruit's texture is sometimes likened to that of the kiwifruit because of its black, crunchy seeds. The seed oil contains the fatty acids linoleic acid and linolenic acid. Dragon fruit is used to flavor and color juices and alcoholic beverages, such as "Dragon's Blood Punch" and the "Dragotini". The flowers can be eaten or steeped as tea.

The red and purple colors of some Selenicereus fruits are due to betacyanins, a family of pigments that includes betanin, the same substance that gives beets, Swiss chard, and amaranth their red color.

Nutrients
As the nutrient content of raw pitaya has not been thoroughly analyzed or published as of 2019, the USDA FoodData Central database reports one limited product label entry from a manufacturer of a branded product, showing that a  reference serving of dried pitaya provides  of food energy, 82% carbohydrates, 4% protein, and 11% of the Daily Value each for vitamin C and calcium (see USDA link in table).

Seed oils 
The fatty acid compositions of the seed oils of Selenicereus costaricensis, syn. Hylocereus costaricensis (red-fleshed pitaya) and Selenicereus undatus, syn. Hylocereus undatus (white-fleshed pitaya)  were similar: myristic acid (negligible), palmitic acid (17%), stearic acid (5%), palmitoleic acid (about 1%), oleic acid (22%), cis-vaccenic acid (3%), linoleic acid (50%), and α-linolenic acid (1%).

Gallery

See also 
 List of culinary fruits
 Opuntia – prickly pear cacti with edible "cactus figs" or tunas fruit

References

External links 

Cacti of Mexico
Cacti of South America
Central American cuisine
Crops originating from the Americas
Desert fruits
Drought-tolerant plants
Epiphytes
Edible fruits
Selenicereus
Mesoamerican cuisine
Night-blooming plants
Stenocereus
Tropical agriculture
Tropical fruit